Orlando Bell Ficklin (December 16, 1808 – May 5, 1886) was a U.S. Representative from Illinois.

Early life and education
Born in Scott County, Kentucky, Ficklin attended the common schools. He was graduated from Transylvania Law School, Lexington, Kentucky, in 1830. He was admitted to the bar in 1830 and commenced practice in Mount Carmel, Illinois. He served in the Black Hawk War as quartermaster in 1832. He served as colonel of the militia of Wabash County in 1833.

Political career
In 1835, Ficklin became state's attorney for the Wabash circuit. He also served as member of the Illinois House of Representatives in 1835, 1838, and 1842. He moved to Charleston, Illinois in 1837.

Ficklin was elected as a Democrat to the Twenty-eighth, Twenty-ninth, and Thirtieth Congresses (March 4, 1843 – March 3, 1849). He served as chairman of the Committee on Public Buildings and Grounds (Twenty-ninth Congress).

Matson slave case 
Although Ficklin worked as co-counsel with Abraham Lincoln on many cases, in possibly their most famous case, they were on opposite sides. In 1847, Ficklin, his friend Charles H. Constable and Usher Linder represented slaves who ran away while in Illinois and believed that they were free, arguing that the Northwest Ordinance forbade slavery in Illinois. Abraham Lincoln defended Robert Matson, a Kentucky slave owner who brought the slaves from his Kentucky plantation to work on land he owned in Illinois. Lincoln invoked the right of transit, which allowed slave holders to take their slaves temporarily into free territory, stressing that Matson did not intend the slaves to remain permanently in Illinois. 

The judge in Coles County ruled for Ficklin's clients and against Lincoln, and the slaves were set free. Illinois and other free states adopted a principle "once free, always free."

Environmental Perspective
Ficklin argued passionately that the federal government must develop the land, cultivating prairie even if such destroyed the native flowers, and wild deer:
Unless the government shall grant head rights ... prairies, with their gorgeous growth of flowers, their green carpeting, their lovely lawns and gentle slopes will for centuries continue to be the home of wild deer and wolf, their stillness will be undisturbed by the jocund song of the farmer, and their deep and fertile soil unbroken by the plowshare.  Something must be done to remedy this evil.

Return to Congress
Voters returned Ficklin to Congress in 1850, and he served in the Thirty-second Congress (March 4, 1851 – March 3, 1853). During that session, Ficklin was chairman of the Committee on District of Columbia (Thirty-second Congress). He resumed the practice of law in Charleston. He served as delegate to the Democratic National Convention in 1856, 1860, and  1864.

In the summer of 1864, Ficklin led a delegation to Washington to secure the release of 15 Coles County men arrested by military authorities for rioting. He requested they be returned to civilian authorities for indictment and trial, and the President granted his request about a week before the November election.

After Lincoln's Presidency
Although a Democrat in an area known for its Copperhead leanings, Ficklin eulogized Lincoln as a statesman and deplored his death.

Ficklin served as delegate to the State constitutional convention in 1869 and 1870. He again served in the Illinois House of Representatives in 1878.

Death and legacy
Ficklin died in Charleston, Illinois, and was interred in Mound Cemetery.

See also
 Charles H. Constable, attorney, judge, and friend of Ficklin.

References

External links 

1808 births
1886 deaths
Democratic Party members of the Illinois House of Representatives
People from Charleston, Illinois
Quartermasters
American militia officers
Democratic Party members of the United States House of Representatives from Illinois
19th-century American politicians
People from Scott County, Kentucky
Military personnel from Illinois